Palaeomedeterus is an extinct genus of flies in the family Dolichopodidae, known from Baltic amber and Cambay amber from the Eocene. The genus was first proposed by Fernand Meunier in 1895 with no included species or description, though illustrations were provided for six different unnamed species (making the name Palaeomedeterus available according to the ICZN).

Species
The genus includes the following species:
 †Palaeomedeterus bifurcatus (Meunier, 1907) (Synonym: Gheynia bifurcata Meunier, 1907) − Baltic amber, Russia, Eocene
 †Palaeomedeterus cambayensis Bickel in Bickel et al., 2022 − Cambay amber, India, Eocene
 †Palaeomedeterus fessus (Meunier, 1907) − Baltic amber, Russia, Eocene
 †Palaeomedeterus hirsutus (Meunier, 1907) − Baltic amber, Russia, Eocene
 †Palaeomedeterus horridus (Meunier, 1907) − Baltic amber, Russia, Eocene
 †Palaeomedeterus ignavus (Meunier, 1907) − Baltic amber, Russia, Eocene
 †Palaeomedeterus languidus (Meunier, 1907) − Baltic amber, Russia, Eocene
 †Palaeomedeterus lassatus (Meunier, 1907) − Baltic amber, Russia, Eocene
 †Palaeomedeterus lentus (Meunier, 1907) − Baltic amber, Russia, Eocene

The following species are considered nomina nuda:
 †Palaeomedeterus meunieri Meuffels & Grootaert, 1999 (replacement name for Tipula culiciformis Meunier, 1899 nec Linnaeus, 1758, a nomen nudum)

References

†
†
Prehistoric Diptera genera
Asilomorph flies of Europe
Fossil taxa described in 1895
Eocene insects